Datanal is a village in Dharwad district of Karnataka, India.

Demographics
As of the 2011 Census of India there were 513 households in Datanal and a total population of 2,628 consisting of 1,373 males and 1,255 females. There were 331 children ages 0-6.

References

Villages in Dharwad district